The New Zealand Dairy Board (NZDB) was a statutory board in control of the export of all New Zealand dairy products from its formation in 1923 until 2001.  It operated through a global network of marketing subsidiaries.

In 2001, the Dairy Board was merged with the two largest New Zealand dairy cooperatives (which represented 96% of the industry) to a company initially called GlobalCo, but shortly afterwards renamed Fonterra.

The merger required approval from the Commerce Commission, which it declined, so a special Act of Parliament, the Dairy Industry Restructuring Act 2001 was passed allowing the merger to occur.

See also
 Fonterra
 New Zealand Meat Producers Board 1922
 New Zealand Wool Board 1944
 Dairy farming in New Zealand
 Agriculture in New Zealand

References

External links
 Our history at Fonterra

Marketing boards
Foreign trade of New Zealand
Dairy farming in New Zealand
Dairy organizations
Fonterra
Dairy marketing
Agricultural organisations based in New Zealand